Gularte is a surname. Notable people with the surname include:

Emanuel Gularte (born 1997), Uruguayan footballer
Rodrigo Gularte (1972–2015), Brazilian citizen
Sebastián Gularte (born 1990), Uruguayan footballer